The 1890 American Cup was the sixth edition of the soccer tournament organized by the American Football Association. The Fall River Olympics won their first title becoming the second Fall River team to do so after the Rovers had won the previous two editions.

First round
The Fall River Rovers and Pawtucket Free Wanderers match was protested because of a dispute regarding gate receipts. The AFA ordered the game replayed. The Rovers disagreed with the decision and elected to withdraw from the Association. Pawtucket therefore was placed in the next round.
 

Providence: G Robert Cook, FB M.Muirhead, McDonald, HB A.Cook, J.Dalton, G.Clegg, LW A.Hellborne, Thomas Morrison, RW J.Attewell, J.Mannion, C Barney Fagan. Lonsdale: G Baine, FB McIntyre, McKay, HB Read, Patterson, Googhegan, LW Jenkins, Hector, RW O’Neil, Fields, C McClagat.

Olympics: GK Harwood, FB Stewart, Lee, HB James Leigh, Burgess, Whittaker, RW Clarkson, Finlan, LW John Randall, Thomas Taylor, C Ingham. EastEnds: GK Marshall, FB Atley, Stanton, HB Sharrocks, Mercer, J.Foley, RW Tobin, P.Farnell, LW J.Taylor, Sunderland, C Snape.

Rovers: GK Shea, FB Bradley, Lonsdale, HB Adams, Waring(c), Buckley, RW Bell, Blakeley, LW Wilde, Duff, C Connell.
Pawtucket: GK Hardy, FB Harry Stewart, Love, HB Smith, Devanney, Lennox, RW Sandiland, Jeffrey, LW Murray, Mularkey, C Graham.

Longfellows: GK M.Gorvin, DF T.Fay, T.Masterton, MF T.Pope, T.Court, R.Neave, FW J.Green, J.McConnell, T.Brockington, C.Gorvin, J.Lennon. O.N.T.: GK T.Hughes, DF A.Lyon, W.Walker, MF J.Polisher, C.Alsopp, G.Williams, FW C.Bradley, A.Smith, T.Henderson, W.Downs, A.Singleton, L.D.Flynn.

Second round

Rovers: GK J.Howarth, DF H.Holden, Jack Hood, MF T.Cranor, Joe Swithemby, W.Barr, FW John Swithemby, F.Costello, A.Cutler, James Hood, J.Connolly. Longfellows: GK W.Gordon, DF T.Fay, T.Masterson, MF T.Pope, D.Campbell, R.Reaves, FW T.Green, J.Taylor, W.Paul, C.Gorvin, J.Leonard.

Trenton- G Harry Kelsall, FB G.Allman, R.Rhodes, HB W.Cooper, J.Irwin, T.Titley, RF A.Cooper, J.James, LF A.Cartidge, D.Baggeley, CF Elder
Thistle- G J.Cameron, FB W.Patrick, S.Russell, HB G.Kirk, T.Duncan, A.Toylie, RF A.Barnoor, J.Adams, LF E.T.Parvis, D.Barbeur, CF R.Robertson

Pawtucket: GK Shea, FB Harry Stuart, Love, HB Hardy, Devanney, Finn, RW Sandilands, Jeffrey, LW Murray, Monahan , C Graham.
Providence: GK Bolan, FB Oborne, McDonald, HB M.Muirhead, J.Dalton, Guy, LW Fagin, J.Manionn, RW Booth, Guy, C A.Hellborne.

replays

Trenton- G Harry Kelsall, FB G.Allman, R.Rhodes, HB W.Cooper, A.Cooper, J.James, I.Irwin FW J.James, T.Titley, L.Byatt, D.Baggeley

Semifinals

Olympics: GK Cornell, FB Harwood(c), Jack Stuart, HB Simon Burgess, Abe Pilling, Whittaker, RW Jimmy Clarkson, Finlan, LW Taylor, Slater, C Ingham.
Pawtucket: GK J.Shea, FB Love, Harry Stuart(c), HB Devanney, David Smith, Finn, RW Sandilands, Jeffrey, LW Murray, Mullarkey, C Graham.

Kearny: GK Cutler, FB Holden, John Hood, HB Crans, Joe Swithemby, Howarth, FW McNabb, Jack Swithemby, Barr, Connelly, James Hood. Trenton: GK W.Bradshaw, FB Almon, Rhodes, HB James, Irwin, Cooper, FW Ward, J.Bradshaw, Heaton, Carthege, Byat.

Final

Olympics: GK William Connell, FB Richard Harwood, John Stuart, HB Simon Burgess, Abraham Pilling, James Whittaker, RW James Clarkson, John Finlan, LW Tommy Taylor, Thomas Slater, C Thomas Ingham.
Rovers: GK Cutler, FB Holden, John Hood, HB Joe Swithemby, Howarth, Crann, RW Woods, John Swithemby, LW Connelly, James Hood, C Barr, Jameson.

American Cup bracket

References

Sources

Boston Globe
New York Herald
New York Times
Providence Journal
Trenton Times
Sunday Call

1890
1890 in association football
1890 in American sports